Fairview Road may refer to:

By country

Canada 
 Fairview Road in Fairview, British Columbia

United Kingdom 
 Fairview Road in Glengormley, County Antrim, Northern Ireland
 Fairview Road, location of part of the 1987 Hungerford massacre in Hungerford, Berkshire
 153-159 Fairview Road, Cheltenham, Gloucestershire

United States 
 Fairview Road, Penn Valley, Pennsylvania

See also 
 Fairview (disambiguation)
 Fairview Drive (disambiguation)